The Eurovision Young Dancers 2003 was the tenth edition of the Eurovision Young Dancers, held at the 
Stadsschouwburg Theatre in Amsterdam, Netherlands between 29 June and 4 July 2003. Organised by the European Broadcasting Union (EBU) and host broadcaster Nederlandse Programma Stichting (NPS), dancers from ten countries participated in the televised final. A total of seventeen countries took part in the competition therefore a semi-final was held a few days before at the same venue.  and  made their début while ,  and  withdrew from the contest.

The semi-final took place on 2 July 2003. Each country could send one or two dancers, male or female, not older than 20. All countries except the host (Netherlands) had to take part in the semi final.

Kristina Oom and Sebastian Michanek of Sweden won the contemporary dance prize, with Jerlin Ndudi of Ukraine winning the classical dance prize. Monika Hejduková and Viktor Konvalinka of Czech Republic won the 'Youth Jury Choice' award.

Location

Stadsschouwburg Theatre in Amsterdam, Netherlands was the host venue for the 2003 edition of the Eurovision Young Dancers. The building is in the neo-Renaissance style dating back to 1894, and is the former home of the National Ballet and Opera.

Format
The format consists of dancers who are non-professional and between the ages of 16–21, competing in a performance of dance routines of their choice, which they have prepared in advance of the competition. All of the acts then take part in a choreographed group dance during 'Young Dancers Week'.

Jury members of a professional aspect and representing the elements of ballet, contemporary, and modern dancing styles, score each of the competing individual and group dance routines. The overall winner upon completion of the final dances is chosen by the professional jury members.

Results

Preliminary round
A total of seventeen countries took part in the preliminary round of the 2003 contest, of which ten qualified to the televised grand final. The following countries failed to qualify.

Final
There were 2 prizes given this year: one for contemporary dance (awarded to ) and one for classical ballet dance (awarded to ). A special "young jury" award was given as well by a group of young viewers that were in the audience, this went to contemporary runner-up .

Classical category

Contemporary category

Jury members 
The jury members consisted of the following:

  – Vladimir Vasiliev
  – Susanne Linke
  – Paola Cantalupo
  – Derrick Brown
  – Liz Imperio

Broadcasting
26 national broadcasters in 24 countries transmitted the 2003 event. Albania, Croatia, Germany, Iceland, Puerto Rico, and Serbia and Montenegro all broadcast the contest in addition to the competing countries.

See also
 Eurovision Song Contest 2003
 Junior Eurovision Song Contest 2003

Notes and references

Notes

References

External links 
 

Eurovision Young Dancers by year
2003 in the Netherlands
July 2003 events in Europe
Events in Amsterdam